Auditory learning is a  learning style in which a person learns through listening.

An auditory learner depends on listening and speaking as a main way of learning. Auditory learners must be able to hear what is being said in order to understand and may have difficulty with instructions that are drawn but if the writing is in a logical order  it can be easier to understand. They also use their listening and repeating skills to sort through the information that is sent to them. They are good listeners when people speak.

The Fleming VAK/VARK model, one of the most common and widely used categorizations of the various types of learning styles, categorized the various types of learning styles as follows: visual learners, auditory learners, reading/writing-preference learners, and kinesthetic learners (also known as "tactile learners").

Characteristics

Auditory learners may have a knack  for ascertaining the true meaning of someone's words by listening to audible signals like changes in tone. When memorizing a phone number, an auditory learner will say it out loud and then remember how it sounded to recall it.

Auditory learners are good at writing responses to  lectures they've heard. They're also good at oral exams, effectively by listening to information delivered orally, in lectures, speeches, and oral sessions.

Proponents claim that when an auditory/verbal learner reads, it is almost impossible for the learner to comprehend anything without sound in the background. In these situations, listening to music or having different sounds in the background (TV, people talking, music, etc.) will help learners work better.

Auditory learners are good at storytelling. They solve  problems by talking them through. Speech patterns include phrases "I hear you; That clicks; It's ringing a bell", and other sound or voice-oriented information. These learners will move their lips or talk to themselves to help accomplish tasks.

Recommended techniques

Proponents say that teachers should use these techniques to instruct auditory learners: verbal direction, group discussions, verbal reinforcement, group activities, reading aloud, and putting information into a rhythmic pattern such as a rap, poem, or song.

Prevalence
Auditory  learners make up about 20% of the population.

Lack of evidence
Although learning styles have "enormous popularity",  and both children and adults express personal preferences, there is no evidence that identifying a student's learning style produces better outcomes, and there is significant evidence that fat the widely touted "meshing hypothesis" (that a student will learn best if taught in a method deemed appropriate for the student's learning style) is  invalid.  Well-designed studies "flatly contradict the popular meshing hypothesis". Rather than targeting instruction to the "right" learning style, students appear to benefit most from mixed modality presentations, for instance using both auditory and visual techniques for all students.

See also

 Auditory memory
 Kinesthetic learning
 Learning styles
 Visual learning

References

Pedagogy
Neuro-linguistic programming concepts and methods
Learning methods
Dyslexia